San Prudencio (Spanish for "Saint Prudence") was a Spanish anchorite and cleric who was bishop over Tarazona. He has been the patron saint of Nájera and Álava since the mid-17th century. His festival is on 28 April.

Life 
He was born and lived in Armentia, a village in the municipality of Vitoria, Álava. When he turned fifteen, he secluded himself in the surroundings of the actual Soria city. He stayed there for around seven years and after that he moved to Calahorra, where there was a large diocesan headquarters. It was recorded that he converted many people in Tarazona where he had settled after leaving Soria. Years later he was admitted as a cleric in the diocese of Tarazona, and oversaw the maintenance of the temple from its construction, and he became an archdeacon. After the death of the bishop of Tarazona, Prudencio was chosen to replace him. As he performed miraculous healings, he became famous among the sick. Deciding to escape from fame, he left Tarazona and returned to Soria. As there were disagreements between the bishopric and the cleric of Burgo de Osma, Prudencio was chosen to be the intermediary. After helping reconcile the two factions, he later succumbed to a mortal illness and died.

Contributions 
San Saturio hermitage (Soria) was built where Prudencio was a disciple of Saturio. Although there are many different documents referring to San Prudencio, it is thought that the breviary of Tarazona is the most credible one. It is not known exactly when he lived, inasmuch as there are many conflicting dates between the late 4th century and the late 6th century. If we take into account that Prudencio's master was born in 493 AD, he would have been born in approximately the mid-6th century.

Death and grave 
As he died in Burgo de Osma, outside his diocese, owing to his venerated status, the fate of his relics led to heated quarrels among the jurisdictions. Legend has it that the matter was solved by placing his dead body on a horse he had used when he was alive, and setting it free. The horse stopped in Logroño and they buried him in a cave of the mountain called Laturce, the actual town of Clavijo (La Rioja). At the site of his grave, a church called San Vicente de Mártir (Saint Vincent the martyr was built. According to the friar Gaspar Coronel, its name was changed to the Monastery of Saint Prudence in 1025. From the 12th century onwards, Laturce mountain and Nájera had many arguments because they did not know where to bury Saint Prudence's remains. Finally most of his remains were interred in the new monastery in 1040, with his head and some smaller bones left at Mount Laturce.

Sanctification in Álava 
In the middle of the 13th century, he was considered as a saint, firstly appeared in San Millán de la Cogolla's monastery cartulary, on 24 April 759, but Prudencio became the pattern of Álava on 18 November 1643 by the own province general meeting. On 5 November 1644 it was voted uniformly on his favor, being ratified in the council on 4 May 1645. In 1688 his own prayer was requested, further of some holidays and his own chapel, located in Armentia.

See also
 San Prudencio's Festival

References

External links
 http://www.catholic.org/saints/saint.php?saint_id=5501
 http://santiebeati.it/dettaglio/51130

Spanish Roman Catholic saints